Matterhorn Peak is a high mountain summit in the San Juan Mountains range of the Rocky Mountains of North America.

Mountain
Matterhorn Peak and neighboring Wetterhorn Peak are named after the Matterhorn and the Wetterhorn, two famous peaks in the Swiss Alps. Both Colorado peaks are pointed rock spires (hence slightly resembling their namesake peaks), whose shapes contrast with the broad bulk of the higher Uncompahgre Peak.

See also

List of Colorado mountain ranges
List of Colorado mountain summits
List of Colorado fourteeners
List of Colorado 4000 meter prominent summits
List of the most prominent summits of Colorado
List of Colorado county high points

References

External links

 

Mountains of Colorado
Mountains of Hinsdale County, Colorado
Uncompahgre National Forest
North American 4000 m summits
San Juan Mountains (Colorado)